Lefkes may refer to several places in Greece:

Lefkes, Amorgos, a village in the island of Amorgos, one of the Cyclades
Lefkes, Chalkidiki, a village in Chalkidiki
Lefkes, Paros, a village in the island of Paros, one of the Cyclades

See also
Lefka
Lefki (disambiguation)
Lefko (disambiguation)